The 1993 Philips Head Cup, also known as the Austrian Open Kitzbühel, was a men's tennis tournament held on outdoor clay courts at the Kitzbüheler Tennisclub in Kitzbühel, Austria that was part of the ATP World Series of the 1993 ATP Tour. It was the 23rd edition of the tournament and was held from 2 August until 9 August 1993. Third-seeded Thomas Muster won the singles title.

Finals

Singles
 Thomas Muster defeated  Javier Sánchez 6–3, 7–5, 6–4
 It was Muster's 4th singles title of the year and 17th of his career.

Doubles
 Juan Garat /  Roberto Saad defeated  Marius Barnard /  Tom Mercer 7–6, 2–6, 6–3

References

External links
 ITF tournament details

Austrian Open(tennis)
Austrian Open Kitzbühel
Austrian Open